Louis Sarno (July 3, 1954 – April 1, 2017) was an American adventurer, recordist and author. In the mid-1980s until about 2016 he made field recordings of the music of a Bayaka (BaAka) "pygmy" forest people while living among them in the Central African Republic. The recordings are now held by the Pitt-Rivers museum at Oxford University, UK. Sarno lived in the CAR for more than 30 years, and held a dual citizenship there and in the United States. He documented some of his experiences in his memoir, Song from the Forest: My Life Among the Pygmies (2015), which Geoff Wisner included in his survey work A Basket of Leaves: 99 Books That Capture the Spirit of Africa.

Of Italian heritage, Louis Sarno was born and raised in Newark, New Jersey. Although without formal training in anthropology or ethnomusicology, in 1985 he went to Africa to record the famous music of the forest people. He and his collaborator Bernie Krause combined recordings of Bayaka music with sounds of their surrounding environment into a two-CD/book package entitled Bayaka: The Extraordinary Music of the Babenzélé Pygmies (Ellipsis Arts).

Louis Sarno married a Bayaka woman for a period of time, and adopted a son (Samedi).

The documentary film Song from the Forest, by German director Michael Obert, tells Sarno's life story. The film premiered at the International Documentary Film Festival Amsterdam 2013 where it was honored with the Award for Best Feature-Length Documentary. A movie based on Sarno's life called Oka! was released in 2011 (in the Aka language, oka means "listen").

Sarno died on April 1, 2017, in Teaneck, New Jersey, due to complications of liver ailments.

References 

1954 births
2017 deaths
American male non-fiction writers
Writers from Newark, New Jersey
American expatriates in the Central African Republic
20th-century American non-fiction writers
20th-century American musicologists
20th-century American male writers
21st-century American non-fiction writers
21st-century American musicologists
21st-century American male writers
American people of Italian descent